Europe Central (2005) is a novel by William T. Vollmann that won the U.S. National Book Award for Fiction.

Plot
Set in Central Europe during the 20th century, it examines a vast array of characters, ranging from generals to martyrs, officers to poets, traitors to artists and musicians. It deals with the moral decisions made by people in the most testing of times and offers a perspective on human actions during wartime. Vollmann makes use of many historical figures as characters such as revolutionary Nadezhda Krupskaya, composer Dmitri Shostakovich, artist Käthe Kollwitz, film director Roman Karmen, poet Anna Akhmatova, SS officer Kurt Gerstein, activists Rosa Luxemburg and Karl Liebknecht, as well as German general Friedrich Paulus and Soviet general Andrey Vlasov.

In an afterword, Vollmann admits that while the book is heavily researched and mostly features real people, the work should be regarded as fiction. He calls it "a series of parables about famous, infamous and anonymous European moral actors at moments of decision." Though largely true to history, a number of anecdotes or details are created by the author, such as the "imaginary love triangle" between Shostakovich, Roman Karmen, and Elena Konstantinovskaya.

Reception
The Times Literary Supplement wrote that Vollmann "has turned to the historical novel and made it his own, fashioning a work which is cinematic in scope, epic in ambition and continuously engaging, [showing] that he is one of the most important and fascinating writers of our time."

The New York Times Book Review described it at his "most welcoming work, possibly his best book… part novel and part stories, virtuoso historical remembrance and focused study of violence."

References

External links
"The Bumbling Shostakovich," essay on Europe Central by Ted Gioia (Fractious Fiction)

2005 American novels
American historical novels
National Book Award for Fiction winning works
Viking Press books
Works by William T. Vollmann
Cultural depictions of Karl Liebknecht
Cultural depictions of Rosa Luxemburg